Jerash University or Jerash Private University (Arabic: جامعة جرش الخاصة) is the only university in Jerash Governorate, Jordan, located about 5 km from Jerash city center. The university offers undergraduate degrees in Arts and science.

About The university

President: Yousef Abu Addous

The approval of the Ministry of Higher Education to establish this university was granted in 1992, and teaching process started in the university in 1993. It was the first private university in northern Jordan, it is the major private investment institution at the level of Jerash Governorate; the university was a contributor to solving the problems of poverty and unemployment. The university graduated more than 30000 students with the bachelor's degree, and more than 800 students with the master's degree. Hence, the university provided the public and private sectors with distinguished professional cadres, including judges in courts, representatives in legislative councils, teachers in schools, accountants in companies, and engineers in contracting and agriculture fields.

Jerash University is located on an area of more than three hundred dunams. The area of the university's buildings is approximately 70.000 square meters. It includes twelve faculties: Faculty of Arts, Faculty of Educational Sciences, Faculty of Business, Faculty of Law, Faculty of Sharia, Faculty of Science, Faculty of Engineering, Faculty of Pharmacy, Faculty of Nursing, Faculty of Information Technology, Faculty of Agriculture and Faculty of Applied Medical Sciences.

Academics 
There were ten colleges in the university in 2012:
 Faculty of Information Technology : 
Computer Science  
Computer Networks .
 Faculty of Literature: 
Arabic Literatures, 
English Literatures, 
Translation, 
Social Science 
Humanities.
Faculty of Nursing :
Nursing .
 Faculty of Engineering : 
Civil Of Engineering 
Electronics & Telecom 
Architecture .
 Faculty of Science : 
chemistry 
Biology 
Mathematics 
Physics .
 Faculty of Economics and Administrative Science :
Accounting 
Admin sciences 
Finance and Banking science
 Faculty of Educational Sciences :
Classroom Teaching 
kindergarten 
General Administration 
General Curriculum.
 Faculty of Shari'a (Islamic Studies):
Jurisprudence 
Comparative Jurisprudence .
 Faculty of Agriculture: the only private university in Jordan that offers a degree in agricultural sciences.
Plants Production 
Animals Production 
agricultural Economics
Food & Nutrition .
 Faculty of Law : 
Public Law 
Private Law .
 Faculty of Pharmacy : 
Pharmacy .
 Applied Medical Science:

 physical Therapy

Library 
The university contains also four deanships: Deanship of Scientific Research and Graduate Studies, Deanship of Accreditation and Quality, Deanship of Student Affairs, and Deanship of distance education.

As for the bachelor's majors, the university offers 26 majors for bachelor's degree, and 10 majors master's degree.

In addition, the university has a computerized scientific library encompassing nearly 125.000 volumes and books; it also contains periodicals and scientific journals covering all disciplines.

The strengths of Jerash University and its attractiveness to students from inside and outside 
Jerash University has acquired elements of strength that made it attractive to every student from inside and outside Jordan, and these elements include:

First: The university is located in the middle of six governorates of the Kingdom's governorates at approximately the same distance from: Amman, Al-Balqa, Zarqa, Mafraq, Irbid and Ajloun.

Second: It is located on the main highway linking Jordan with neighboring countries, especially Syria, which is characterized by heavy traffic, facilitating access to and from the university.

Third: The local and regional academic position attained by the university since its inception through the establishment of a number of international conferences, the conclusion of a number of cooperation agreements with universities and international research centers, and the issuance of an international refereed journal “Jerash for Research and Studies”. Moreover, the university is a member of the Association of Arab Universities, the Federation of Universities the Islamic World, the Association of Arab and European Universities, the Association of International Universities, and the Association of Arab Private Institutions for Higher Education.

Fourth: The university has a system to protect foreign students, by providing them with appropriate accommodation and assistance in various fields.

Fifth: The university recruits a large number of faculty members with diverse specializations and long experience in academic fields.

Sixth: It is the only university among the Jordanian private universities that contains a College of Agriculture that is distinguished locally, regionally and internationally.

Seventh: Providing educational opportunities and scholarships for the local, Arab and Islamic community, and it works on an installment schemethat is convenient for students.

Jerash University, with its new administration, has adopted an open-door policy, serious dialogue, and consideration for all opinions, and it believes in excellent contributions from faculty members, administrators and students, so that the outputs are at the desired level.

The vision of Jerash University is: excellence in the fields of education and scientific research, community service, and upgrading to the ranks of the most prestigious universities locally, regionally and internationally.

The university's mission is to build and develop a knowledge society by creating a university environment, a community partnership that stimulates creativity, freedom of thought and expression, and keeping pace with technological developments in the field of education, so as to provide society with the qualified human resources that are appropriate to the needs of the labor market.

The university's values: social and moral commitment, pertinence, justice, equality, creativity, quality, distinction, transparency, accountability, disciplined freedom, and the future outlook.

The university's Strategic Plan 2019-2022 includes eleven themes, namely:

I- Study programs and plans.

II- Scientific research.

III- Human Resources.

IV- Students.

V- Quality Management.

VI- Infrastructure.

VII- Administrative Development.

VIII- Community Service.

IX-Promoting the university's financial position.

X- Global Spread.

XI- Governance and Strategic Planning.

May God protect Jordan, under the leadership of His Majesty the Hashemite King Abdullah II Ibn Al Hussein, the patron of science and scholars, and the custodian of Islamic and Christian holy sites in Al-Quds Al-Sharif and Al-Aqsa, the King whose roots extend to his Hashemite ancestors to more than a thousand four hundred and forty years ago.

Centers 

 Languages Center 
 Consultations
 Computer and IT Center. 
 Career Guidance .
 Consultant Office.

References

External links
 Jerash University website
 

Educational institutions established in 1992
Jerash Governorate
Jerash University
1992 establishments in Jordan